The Capture of Monterey by the United States Navy and Marine Corps occurred in 1842. After hearing false news that war had broken out between the United States and Mexico, the commander of the Pacific Squadron Thomas ap Catesby Jones sailed from Lima, Peru with three warships to Monterey, California. The Americans' objective was to take control of the capital city before a suspected British cession could be achieved.

Capture
American forces included the frigate USS United States and the two sloops-of-war USS Dale and USS Cyane. The squadron arrived in Monterey Bay on October 19 and anchored. Commodore Jones sent his second-in-command, Captain James Armstrong, ashore to demand a Mexican surrender by 9:00 a.m. the following morning. The Mexican garrison consisted of only 58 men in an old fort. Since they chose not to resist when 9:00 a.m. came, 50 American marines and 100 sailors landed and captured the city without incident.

Aftermath
It was only the next day that Jones learned that war had not begun between the United States and Mexico and that the British were not preparing to take control of California. The Mexican troops were freed and, the landing party boarded their ships and set sail, saluting the Mexican flag as it exited the harbor.

Jones headed for Hawaii, which had just been  taken over by the British, and helped to restore the Kingdom of Hawaii. The incident proved unpopular in Mexico, and in response, Monterey's garrison constructed shore batteries and other defenses to guard its city from future attack, which came in 1846, during the Mexican–American War. 

Jones was relieved of duty but eventually served in the war with Mexico.

References

Smith, Gene A., Thomas ap Catesby Jones, Commodore of Manifest Destiny, Annapolis Maryland: Naval Institute Press (2000)  retrieved 8/27/10

1842 in Alta California
Monterey
Independent Mexico
Military history of California
Monterey, California
Monterey
Punitive expeditions of the United States
History of Monterey County, California
The Californias
October 1842 events